Abderrahmane Yousfi (born June 30, 1994 in Oran) is an Algerian footballer who currently plays for NA Hussein Dey in the Algerian Ligue Professionnelle 1. An ASM Oran youth product, he moved to France when he was 16 to continue his footballing career and joined Olympique de Marseille's youth ranks in 2012.

References

External links
 

1994 births
Algerian footballers
Algerian Ligue Professionnelle 1 players
ASM Oran players
Algerian expatriate footballers
Algerian expatriate sportspeople in France
Expatriate footballers in France
NA Hussein Dey players
People from Oran
Olympique de Marseille players
Stade Rennais F.C. players
US Créteil-Lusitanos players
Championnat National players
Living people
Association football forwards
21st-century Algerian people